The 2007 Conference USA baseball tournament was the 2007 postseason college baseball championship of the NCAA Division I Conference USA, held at Clark-LeClair Stadium in Greenville, North Carolina, from May 23–May 27, 2007.  Rice won tournament for the second consecutive time and received Conference USA's automatic bid to the 2007 NCAA Division I baseball tournament.  The tournament consisted of eight teams, with two double-elimination brackets, and a single-game final.

Regular season results

Records listed are conference play only. SMU, Tulsa, and UTEP did not field baseball teams.  Marshall did not qualify for tournament play.

Bracket

 Bold indicates the winner of the game.
 Italics indicate that the team was eliminated from the tournament.

Finish order

All-tournament team

References

Tournament
Conference USA Baseball Tournament
Colonial Athletic Association baseball tournament
Colonial Athletic Association baseball tournament
Baseball in North Carolina
College sports in North Carolina
Greenville, North Carolina
Sports competitions in North Carolina
Tourist attractions in Pitt County, North Carolina